Thomas Galligan (born 15 September 1996) is an Irish Gaelic footballer who plays for the Cavan county team. He plays his club football with Lacken.

Playing career

College
Galligan went to school at St Patrick's College in Cavan. Galligan starred in the 2015 season as St Pat's reached their first MacRory Cup final since 1975. On 17 March 2015, Galligan started in midfield in the final against St Patrick's Academy, Dungannon. Galligan scored 2 points in a 2-12 to 0-8 win. He also received the man of the match award. Galligan played in the Hogan Cup semi-final against PBS Chorca Dhuibhne, where St Pat's suffered a three-point loss.

Club
Galligan has played with Lacken from a young age. He has yet to win a championship medal at senior level.

Inter-county

Minor and under-21
Galligan represented Cavan at minor and under-21 level, but had little success at either grade.

Senior
Galligan joined the Cavan senior squad ahead of the 2017 season. On 25 June 2017 he made his championship debut as a substitute in a qualifier against Offaly.

On 18 May 2019, Galligan made his first championship start for Cavan at full forward in an Ulster championship win against Monaghan. On 23 June, Galligan came on as a substitute in the Ulster final loss to Donegal.

On 31 October 2020, Galligan came on as a half-time substitute against Monaghan in the Ulster preliminary round, with Cavan seven points behind. Cavan eventually won by one point after extra-time with Galligan being named man of the match. On 22 November, Galligan started in midfield in the Ulster final against Donegal. Galligan went down injured multiple times but still put in a man of the match performance as Cavan won their first Ulster title since 1997. Galligan was sent off late on as Cavan lost the All-Ireland semi-final to Dublin. After the All-Ireland final, Galligan was named on The Sunday Game Team of the Year. Galligan was later selected at midfield on the All Star team.

On 2 April 2022, Galligan started the National League Division 4 final against Tipperary at Croke Park, with Cavan coming out winners on a 2–10 to 0-15 scoreline. On 9 July, Galligan started the inaugural Tailteann Cup final against Westmeath. Galligan was sent off in the 58th minute, and Westmeath finished strong to go home with the silverware.

In September 2022, it was reported that Galligan wouldn't feature for Cavan in 2023, as he was planning to go travelling to Australia.

Honours
Cavan
 Ulster Senior Football Championship (1): 2020
 National Football League Division 4 (1): 2022

St. Patrick's College Cavan
 MacRory Cup (1): 2015

Individual
 All Star Award (1): 2020
 The Sunday Game Team of the Year (1): 2020
 Irish News Ulster Footballer of the Year (1): 2020
 Irish News Ulster All-Star (1): 2020
 GAA/GPA Footballer of the Month (1): November 2020

References

1996 births
Living people
Cavan inter-county Gaelic footballers
Lacken Celtic Gaelic footballers